Jahliyan (also Romanized as Jahlīyān, Jahleyān, Jahlīān, and Jahlīār) is a village in Jahliyan Rural District, in the Central District of Konarak County, Sistan and Baluchestan Province, Iran. At the 2006 census, its population was 470, in 96 families.

References 

Populated places in Konarak County